11α-Hydroxyprogesterone (11α-OHP), or 11α-hydroxypregn-4-ene-3,20-dione is an endogenous steroid and metabolite of progesterone. It is a weak antiandrogen, and is devoid of androgenic, estrogenic, and progestogenic activity. 

11α-OHP was investigated as a topical antiandrogen for the treatment of androgen-dependent skin conditions in the early 1950s, and was found to produce some benefit. In 1995, 11α-OHP, along with its epimer 11β-hydroxyprogesterone, was identified as a very potent competitive inhibitor of both isoforms (1 and 2) of 11β-hydroxysteroid dehydrogenase (11β-HSD). It is notably not metabolized by 11β-HSD2.

11α-OHP is a more potent inhibitor of 11β-HSD than enoxolone (glycyrrhetinic acid) or carbenoxolone in vitro (IC50 = 0.9 nM; IC50 = 5 nM in transfected cells). The compound has been found to be highly active in conferring mineralocorticoid sodium-retaining activity of corticosterone in vivo in rat bioassays and in increasing blood pressure, effects that it mediates by preventing the 11β-HSD-mediated inactivation of endogenous corticosteroids. 

Because of its inhibition of 11β-HSD and consequent potentiation of corticosteroids, 11α-OHP has recently been patented for the treatment of skin diseases, particularly psoriasis in combination with clobetasol propionate and minoxidil.

11α-OHP is used as a precursor in chemical syntheses of cortisone and hydrocortisone.

See also
 Steroidal antiandrogen
 List of steroidal antiandrogens
 Glycyrrhizin

References

11β-Hydroxysteroid dehydrogenase inhibitors
Cyclohexanols
Diketones
Pregnanes
Steroidal antiandrogens
Enones